Britt Rampelberg (born ) is a Belgian female volleyball player. She is part of the Belgium women's national volleyball team.

She competed at the 2017 Girls' U18 Volleyball European Championship, and 2018 FIVB Volleyball Women's Nations League. 
On club level she plays for Topsportschool Vilvoorde.

References

External links 

 FIVB profile
 CEV profile

2000 births
Living people
Belgian women's volleyball players
Place of birth missing (living people)
Liberos
21st-century Belgian women